The VPRO/Boy Edgar Award, is an annual award given to a Dutch jazz musician, composer, or bandleader. The individual must have made significant contributions to the Dutch jazz scene over a significant period of time. The award is a sculpture by Dutch fine artist Jan Wolkers, and a cash prize of 12,500 euros.  It is widely regarded as the Netherlands' most prestigious and honorable jazz award. The award is given under the auspicies of the VPRO and Music Center the Netherlands.

The prize was inaugurated in 1963 as the Wessel Ilcken Prijs, named after drummer Wessel Ilcken; in 1980 it was renamed the Boy Edgar Prijs, after Boy Edgar. VPRO linked its name to the prize in 1992.

Winners

 1963 Herman Schoonderwalt
 1964 Boy Edgar
 1965 Piet Noordijk
 1966 Misha Mengelberg
 1967 Han Bennink
 1968 Harry Verbeke
 1969 Hans Dulfer
 1970 Willem Breuker
 1971 Gijs Hendriks
 1972 Kees Hazevoet
 1973 Leo Cuypers
 1974 Orkest De Boventoon
 1975 Ohm
 1976/1977 (not awarded)
 1978 Stichting Claxon Maarten Altena and Michel Waisvisz
 1979 Theo Loevendie
 1980 Rein de Graaff
 1981 Guus Janssen
 1982 Alan Laurillard
 1983 Nedly Elstak
 1984 Martin van Duynhoven
 1985 Ernst Reijseger
 1986 Michael Moore
 1987 J.C. Tans
 1988 John Engels
 1989 Ab Baars
 1990 Greetje Bijma
 1991 (not awarded)
 1992 Willem van Manen
 1993 Willem Breuker
 1994 Franky Douglas
 1995 Wolter Wierbos
 1996/97 Michiel Braam
 1997/98 Corrie van Binsbergen
 1998/99 Paul van Kemenade
 2000 Sean Bergin
 2001 Eric Vloeimans
 2002 Tony Overwater
 2003 Tobias Delius
 2004 Luc Houtkamp
 2006 Benjamin Herman
 2007 Bert van den Brink
 2008 Pierre Courbois
 2009 Ernst Glerum
 2010 Anton Goudsmit
 2011 Ferdinand Povel
 2012 Yuri Honing
 2013 Oene van Geel
 2014 Jeroen van Vliet
 2015 Tineke Postma
 2016 Wilbert de Joode

External links
VPRO/Boy Edgar Award

Jazz awards
Dutch music awards
Awards established in 1963